The French Gulch Historic District, in French Gulch, California in northern California, is a historic district which was listed on the National Register of Historic Places in 1972.

It runs along both sides of Main St. (which has also been referred to as French Gulch Rd.) through a historic mining town.

It includes:
Saint Anne's Catholic Church (c.1900).  Wood frame, with bell-tower/steeple.  Likely was demolished by 2011; probably was located at 
Feeny Hotel (1887), still in operation in 1970, as "French Gulch Hotel", at 
Franck's Store (1867), stone building of store founded 1854; owner's descendants still operated store in 1970.
Franck Residence (c.1860s), west side of Main St. One-story wood-frame house.
I.O.O.F. Hall (c.1860s), west side of Main St., of chapter founded 1858. Likely was demolished by 2011.
Gartland Cabin (c.1856). Oldest surviving building in French Gulch.
Commercial buildings and residences within a large north–south oriented rectangle  encompassing both sides of Main St.

See also
Gladstone Houses, about 3.5 miles to the northeast, up Cline Gulch Rd., homes of mine owner

References

Historic districts on the National Register of Historic Places in California
National Register of Historic Places in Shasta County, California